The Tour de Castellare is a ruined Genoese tower located in the commune of Pietracorbara on the east coast of Corsica. Only part of the square base survives.

The tower was built in the second half of the 16th century. It was one of a series of coastal defences constructed by the Republic of Genoa between 1530 and 1620 to stem the attacks by Barbary pirates. In Genoese documents the tower is called the tower of Ampuglia.

References

Towers in Corsica